Fred Karoho Oala (born ) is a Papua New Guinean male weightlifter, competing in the 56 kg category and representing Papua New Guinea at international competitions. He won the silver medal at the 2013 Pacific Mini Games. He participated at the 2014 Commonwealth Games in the 56 kg event. He won the bronze medal in the clean & jerk at the 2015 Pacific Games.

Major competitions

Medalbox note

References

External links

1996 births
Living people
Papua New Guinean male weightlifters
Place of birth missing (living people)
Weightlifters at the 2014 Commonwealth Games
Commonwealth Games competitors for Papua New Guinea